Sculpture Stage is an outdoor 1976 stainless steel sculpture by Bruce West, located in Tom McCall Waterfront Park in downtown Portland, Oregon. The work was funded by the Comprehensive Employment and Training Act and is part of the City of Portland and Multnomah County Public Art Collection courtesy of the Regional Arts & Culture Council.

Description and history

Sculpture Stage is a 1976 welded stainless steel sculpture by Bruce West, with assistance from poet Tom Culberton, artist Jeff Tolbert and Hugh Mitchell, the landscape architect of Tom McCall Waterfront Park's Riverfront Plaza. It is located at the intersection of Southwest Ankeny and Southwest Naito Parkway, just south of the Burnside Bridge. The piece was commissioned for $28,000 by the Portland Development Commission, with funds from the Comprehensive Employment and Training Act. It is approximately 11 feet, 7 inches tall x 63 feet wide and was designed to cover the Ankeny pumping station and serve a backdrop for a stage. The Smithsonian Institution categorizes the sculpture as abstract and describes it as a "curved relief in six sections with horizontal lines suggesting a landscape, and may be used as a backdrop for a stage".

The work was surveyed and considered "well maintained" by Smithsonian's "Save Outdoor Sculpture!" program in April 1993. At that time, it was administered by the City of Portland's Development Commission. Presently, the work is part of the City of Portland and Multnomah County Public Art Collection courtesy of the Regional Arts & Culture Council.

See also

 1976 in art
 Untitled (West) (1977), another Portland sculpture by Bruce West

References

External links
 Sculpture Stage at Public Art Archive

1976 establishments in Oregon
1976 sculptures
Abstract sculptures in Oregon
Old Town Chinatown
Outdoor sculptures in Portland, Oregon
Southwest Portland, Oregon
Stainless steel sculptures in Oregon
Tom McCall Waterfront Park